Lesica  is a village in the administrative district of Gmina Międzylesie, within Kłodzko County, Lower Silesian Voivodeship, in south-western Poland, near the border with the Czech Republic. Prior to 1945 it was in Germany.

References

Lesica